Wall's is formerly an ice cream and meat products brand in the UK, now split into two businesses:

Wall's (ice cream), a brand owned by Unilever that makes ice cream
Wall's (meat), a British sausage brand owned by Kerry Foods

See also
Walls (disambiguation)
Wall (disambiguation)